In applied mathematics, highly optimized tolerance (HOT) is a method of generating power law behavior in systems by including a global optimization principle. It was developed by Jean M. Carlson and  John Doyle in the early 2000s. For some systems that display a characteristic scale, a global optimization term could potentially be added that would then yield power law behavior.  It has been used to generate and describe internet-like graphs, forest fire models and may also apply to biological systems.

Example
The following is taken from Sornette's book.

Consider a random variable, that takes on values  with probability .  Furthermore, let’s assume for another parameter 

for some fixed .  We then want to minimize

subject to the constraint

Using Lagrange multipliers, this gives

giving us a power law.

See also
 self-organized criticality

References

.
.
.
.
.
.
.
.
.

Mathematical optimization